Tindobate  is a village development committee in Syangja District in the Gandaki Zone of central Nepal. 9 km of the Siddartha Highway lies in this VDC. Karadi and Bayatatri are two small town of Tindobate on the Siddhartha Highway. At the time of the 2011 Nepal census it had a population of 4596 people living in 994 individual households.

References

External links
UN map of the municipalities of Syangja District

Populated places in Syangja District